Idaho (SSN-799), a , will be the fifth U.S. Navy vessel named for the state of Idaho. Secretary of the Navy Ray Mabus announced the name on 23 August 2015, at a ceremony in Idaho. The keel laying ceremony took place 24 August 2020 at the Quonset Point Facility of General Dynamics Electric Boat in North Kingston, RI. Idaho is projected to cost around $2.6 billion dollars and to be commissioned in 2023.

References

External links 
 USS Idaho Commissioning Committee

 

Virginia-class submarines
Submarines of the United States Navy